Pradeep S. Mehta is the Secretary General of Consumer Unity & Trust Society (CUTS), a non-profit organisation that focuses on providing the poor with access to developmental opportunities. Mehta founded CUTS in 1983 and helped the organisation establish its presence in seven countries around the world. Mehta has been an active member of high-level panels on policies for World Trade Organisation (WTO) and the Government of India.

Mehta is also a regular author of books that discuss policies and regulations. He serves as a featured columnist with several leading publications.

Career
Mehta's journey with CUTS began in the 80s with the launch of a Hindi monthly wall newspaper known as Gram Gadar. This paper served as a mouthpiece that helped the poor understand the governmental schemes targeted at them. Gram Gadhar's success inspired Mehta to expand his focus – he worked towards ensuring the poor have access to basic amenities, education and equal rights.

Today, CUTS International has a major presence in India through centres that help resolve developmental challenges faced by societies. The organisation also has a presence in Switzerland, Vietnam, Ghana, Kenya, Zambia and the US.

Mehta's notable books include 'Evolution of Competition Laws and their Enforcement: A Political Economy Perspective', 'Towards a Functional Competition Policy for India', 'Politics Triumphs Economics?: Political Economy and the Implementation of Competition Law and Economic Regulation in Developing Countries', 'Essays on the International Trading System: An Unfinished Journey', 'Reflections from the Frontline: Developing Country Negotiators in the WTO', among others. Mehta is also a regular columnist with most of India's leading national papers, including The Economic Times, The Hindu Business Line and Mint.

Two Festschrift's have been published in his honour by the name of ‘Growth and Equity’ edited by Nitin Desai in 2013 and 'Putting Consumers First' in 2018 by Sanjaya Baru respectively.

Recently, he has been conferred with the SKOCH Challenger Award for his contribution to Public Policy on Competition. This is the third such award that he has received for his work on Competition Policy & Law. The earlier two were the M. R. Pai Award and the Scindia School's Madhav Award for a Distinguished Old Boy. Mehta has also been nominated to a high-level Environment Committee of the World Mining Congress, 2023 to be organised by the University of Queensland, Brisbane, Australia.

Personal life 

Mehta is married to former entrepreneur Aruna Mehta. They have two children.
Mehta completed his schooling at Scindia School, Gwalior in 1965. He then graduated from St. Xavier's College, Calcutta in 1968. He also studied his L.L.B. from Rajasthan University, Jaipur in 1975 but did not write the final exams.

References

21st-century Indian writers
1948 births
Living people